Vasant was a Gujarati-language magazine founded and edited by Anandshankar Dhruv, which ran from 1902 to 1939. The magazine played a key role in the development of Gujarati prose writing, and is considered to hold a significant place in the tradition of Gujarati literary magazines.

History
Anandshankar Dhruv was a close-friend and disciple of Gujarati writer and philosopher Manilal Dwivedi, and published articles in Manilal's magazine Sudarshan. Following Manilal's death in 1898, Dhruv assumed the editorship of Sudarshan for about four years. In 1902, realizing that he was unable to develop Manilal's line of thinking and mission further, and feeling himself unfit to follow 's sectarian approach, Dhruv gave up the editorship of the magazine to start his own monthly, Vasant.

Dhruv stated the aim of Vasant in its first issue:

Ramanbhai Neelkanth edited the magazine from 1912 to 1924, with Dhruv resuming editorship again from 1925. Irregular publication led to Vasant becoming a quarterly in 1936. It was disestablished in 1939.

Contents
Vasant covered a wide range of topics, including: religion, philosophy, poetry, ethics, politics, education, economics, sociology, science, research, and various aspects of literature and life. From its first issue, the magazine published a series of articles written by Uttamlal Trivedi under the title "Saraswatichandra ane Aapno Grihasansar" (Saraswatichandra and the Web of Our Family-life), based on Govardhanram Tripathi's novel Saraswatichandra. After the death of Govardhanram Tripathi in January 1907,  in March 1907 Dhruv published a special volume of Vasant dedicated to Tripathi.

The magazine's regular contributors included: Manishankar Bhatt (Kant), Nhanalal, Narayan Hemchandra, Ramanbhai Neelkanth, Vishnuprasad Trivedi, Krishnalal Jhaveri, Balwantray Thakore, and Narsinhrao Divetia.

Reception
Vasant is considered to hold a significant place in the tradition of Gujarati literary magazines, and played a key role in the development of Gujarati prose writing.

See also
 List of Gujarati-language magazines

Notes

References

External links
 

1902 establishments in British India
1939 disestablishments in India
Gujarati-language magazines
Monthly magazines published in India
Magazines established in 1902
Magazines disestablished in 1939
Mass media in Gujarat
Defunct magazines published in India